Diponegoro Stadium is a football stadium in the town of Banyuwangi, Indonesia. The stadium has a capacity of 15,000 people.

It is the home base of Persewangi Banyuwangi.

References

Banyuwangi (town)
Sports venues in Indonesia
Football venues in Indonesia
Multi-purpose stadiums in Indonesia